June Bragger (2 June 1929 – 27 June 1997) was an English cricketer who played primarily as a bowler. She appeared in five Test matches for England between 1963 and 1966. She mainly played domestic cricket for Warwickshire, as well as playing matches for Lancashire and West Midlands.

References

External links
 
 

1929 births
1997 deaths
Cricketers from Birmingham, West Midlands
England women Test cricketers
Lancashire women cricketers
Warwickshire women cricketers
West Midlands women cricketers